Kashinawa (also spelled Kaxinawá, Kashinawa, Kaxynawa, Caxinawa, Caxinawá, and Cashinahua), or Hantxa Kuin (Hãtxa Kuĩ), is an indigenous American language of western South America which belongs to the Panoan language family. It is spoken by about 1,600 Kaxinawá in Peru, along the Curanja and the Purus Rivers, and in Brazil by 400 Kaxinawá in the state of Acre.

About five to ten percent of speakers have some Spanish language proficiency, while forty percent are literate and twenty to thirty percent are literate in Spanish as a second language.

Dialects are Brazilian Kashinawa, Peruvian Kashinawa, and the extinct Juruá Kapanawa (Capanahua of the Juruá River) and Paranawa.

Phonology

Vowels 

 can also be heard as mid-back .
Although nasalization is generally marked by placing a tilde over the vowel, some authors choose to mark it with a following  to denote that the previous vowel or contiguous vowels are nasalised.

Consonants 

Dictionary 
A dictionary has been compiled and published since 1980.

Orthography 
The Roman alphabet is used. There is an interrogative punctuation mark different from the question mark.

Morphology 
Articles and adjectives are placed after nouns.  There are seven prefixes and five suffixes.

References

External links
 Cashinahua Pronunciation and Spelling Guide, Native Languages of the Americas website. 1998-2008.
 Wise, Mary Ruth. 1981. Diccionario Cashinahua. Yarinacocha, Peru: Instituto Lingüístico del Verano.
 Animacy and mythology in Hantxa Kuin (Cashinahua), Department of Linguistics, Max Planck Institute for Evolutionary Anthropology.
 Kensinger, Kenneth M. The phonological hierarchy of Cashinahua (Pano). Summer Institute of Linguistics, University of Oklahoma. 1963.
 Montag, Richard. 2008 Participant Referencing in Cashinahua. SIL International.
 Cashinahua DoReCo corpus compiled by Sabine Reiter. Audio recordings of narrative texts with transcriptions time-aligned at the phone level, translations, and - for some texts - time-aligned morphological annotations.

Languages of Peru
Languages of Brazil
Panoan languages